A video teleconferencing unit (VTU) is a piece of electrical equipment that performs videoconferencing functions, such as the coding and decoding of audio and video signals and multiplexing of video, audio, data, and control signals, and that usually does not include Input/Output (I/O) devices, cryptographic devices, network interface equipment, network connections, or the communications network to which the unit is connected.

See also 

 Videoconferencing

References 

Videotelephony
Telecommunications equipment